Mörbylånga Municipality (Mörbylånga kommun) is a municipality in Kalmar County, in south-eastern Sweden, located on the island of Öland in the Baltic Sea. The seat is located in the town of Mörbylånga, while the largest town is Färjestaden.

The present municipality, making up the southern part of Öland, was formed in 1974. The eighteen original entities (as of 1863) had during the nationwide subdivision reform of 1952 been regrouped into three larger units. Ottenby was amalgamated with Mörbylånga in 1967 and 1974 Torslunda was added.

Mörbylånga Municipality contains several ancient remains, just like the northern Öland municipality of Borgholm. All in all, there are about 20 hillforts on Öland. The most notable in southern Öland is the fortress Eketorp.

The southern parts of Öland contain certain wildlife areas. Many migratory birds halt here on their way north or south. Especially the southernmost outpost, the lighthouse Långe Jan (Tall John) is visited by many birdwatchers every day, as many birds flock here until setting away over the ocean.

Localities
There are 9 urban areas (also called a Tätort or locality) in Mörbylånga Municipality.

In the table the localities are listed according to the size of the population as of December 31, 2005. The municipal seat is in bold characters.

Elections

Riksdag
These are the results of the elections to the Riksdag since the first election after the municipal reform that was held in 1973. The results only include parties that have won representation in the Riksdag assembly at least once during this timeframe. The results of the Sweden Democrats were not listed at a municipal level by the SCB between 1988 and 1998 due to the party's small size at the time. "Turnout" denotes the number of voters who cast a ballot in the polling station, but "Votes" only counts those casting valid ballots.

Blocs

This lists the relative strength of the socialist and centre-right blocs since 1973, but parties not elected to the Riksdag are inserted as "other", including the Sweden Democrats results from 1988 to 2006, but also the Christian Democrats pre-1991 and the Greens in 1982, 1985 and 1991. The sources are identical to the table above. The coalition or government mandate marked in bold formed the government after the election. New Democracy got elected in 1991 but are still listed as "other" due to the short lifespan of the party. "Elected" is the total number of percentage points from the municipality that went to parties who were elected to the Riksdag.

Mörbylånga and surroundings

References
Statistics Sweden

External links

Mörbylånga Municipality - Official site
Southern Öland - Tourism page (in Swedish, English and German)

 
Municipalities of Kalmar County